is a fictional character in the Persona series, appearing as a main character in Persona 3. She is the unofficial leader of an organization called SEES (Specialized Extracurricular Execution Squad), which the main characters of the game participate in to fight creatures called Shadows.

Concept and creation
Mitsuru Kirijo is the only child of the head of the Kirijo Group, Takeharu Kirijo and a top-ranking valedictorian and student council president. In battle, she wields one-handed swords such as rapiers and sabers and Ice-based magic. She is voiced by Rie Tanaka in Japanese and Tara Platt in English. Shigenori Soejima created Mitsuru to be a tough-looking woman on the exterior, but with a weak side in the interior. She is portrayed by Asami Tano in Persona 3: The Weird Masquerade, the Persona 4 Arena stage play, and the Persona 4 Arena Ultimax Song Project stage play.

Appearances
Mitsuru appears in Persona 3. She has been battling Shadows since she was a little girl, as the unofficial leader of SEES (Special Extracurricular Execution Squad). At the beginning of the game she avoids battle and acts as a support character, offering analysis and advice. She joins the party in combat only after the discovery of Fuuka Yamagishi, whose Persona's analysis power is much stronger. Throughout the story, Mitsuru hides many details about Tartarus and the Dark Hour from the group, due to feelings of guilt over her family's involvement in the accident that created them. Since her grandfather was responsible for everything, she believes that she alone bears the burden of setting the world right. Her Persona was artificially induced to allow her to participate in the battle against the Shadows. Mitsuru is the only SEES member that had her ability to summon a Persona forced on her. Mitsuru loses all will to fight after Ikutsuki kills her father, since restoring the family honor is meaningless without a family. She regains her resolve thanks to some intervention from Yukari. She decides to take over leadership of the Kirijo Group after the conflict with Nyx is finished and she graduates high school.

Mitsuru appears as a playable character in Persona 4 Arena, which takes place over two years after the events of "The Answer". Now 20 years old, Mitsuru is a university student and the leader of the Shadow Operatives, a group composed of Persona users that fights Shadows. She joins Aigis and Akihiko to search for the Anti-Shadow weapon Labrys that disappeared from her plane. Her Persona is Artemisia.

Reception
Mitsuru has received generally positive reception. She was named one of the 10 best Persona characters by Kimberley Wallace of Game Informer. She praised Mitsuru for being a self-actualizing person and for how caring she is. Wallace also regarded her as the best female character in role-playing games and noted the relationship between the Persona 3 protagonist and her as "thoroughly enjoy[able]." Sam Marchello of RPGamer called her a "babe," while Chris Moyse of Destructoid called her "the coolest character" in Persona, praising her for her fashion sense. Meghan Sullivan of IGN also ranked her among the best Persona characters, similarly praising her for being a caring and strong character. When playing as a male character in Persona 3, Cassandra Khaw of USGamer found her "accomplished and elegant"; however, when she played as a girl, she found her "too distant." Ben lee of Digital Spy called her the "standout" member of the cast due to her being "intelligent, tough-minded" and knowing "what she wants." Mike Fahey of Kotaku called her the series "greatest heroine," identifying her "power" and "confidence" as two of her strong qualities. Kotaku writer Leigh Alexander discussed how her perspective changed between playing Persona 3 as a guy to a girl regarding Mitsuru; where she found Mitsuru admirable when playing as a male character, she found her "irritatingly perfect." Destructoid Steven Hansen, who was reluctant about the chibi art style of Persona Q, felt less so after seeing Mitsuru, who he felt was cute and was convincing.

Her portrayal in the Persona 4 Arena musical received praise from Richard Eisenbeis of Kotaku, calling her portrayal "perfect" and praising the chemistry between her and Akihiko. VentureBeat expressed similar comments calling her "like a sword-wielding Emma Peel".

References

Female characters in video games
Fictional characters with evocation or summoning abilities
Fictional female businesspeople
Fictional female swordfighters
Fictional fencers
Fictional high school students
Fictional Japanese people in video games
Fictional swordfighters in video games
Persona characters
Sega protagonists
Teenage characters in video games
Video game characters introduced in 2006
Video game characters who have mental powers
Video game characters with ice or cold abilities